A list of all films produced by the Philippines in the 1990s. For an A-Z see :Category:Philippine films.

1990

1991

1992

1993

1994

1995

1996

1997

1998

1999

References

External links
Filipino film at the Internet Movie Database

1990s
Films
Philippines